We Are Far from the Sun is a Canadian drama film, directed by Jacques Leduc and released in 1971. The film centres on the Bessettes, a contemporary working-class family in Montreal who are struggling to make ends meet, through a narrative frame structured around the philosophies and values of influential Québécois religious leader Brother André Bessette.

The film's cast includes Marthe Nadeau, Pierre Curzi, Willie Lamothe, Reynald Bouchard, J.-Léo Gagnon, Claude Jutra, Marcel Sabourin and Esther Auger.

The film was produced and shot in 1970, and released theatrically in 1971.

References

External links

1971 films
1971 drama films
Canadian drama films
Films shot in Quebec
Films set in Quebec
Films directed by Jacques Leduc
National Film Board of Canada films
1970s French-language films
French-language Canadian films
1970s Canadian films